During the 2015-16 season, the Hull Pirates participated in the semi-professional English Premier Ice Hockey League. It was their first season as a club.

After a run of seven straight defeats to start the season (pre-season and regular season) the club announced the release of club captain Jan Platil.

Standings

English Premier League

[**] EPIHL League Champions. [*] Secured play-off berth

Schedule and results

Preseason
The pre-season started with a defeat on home ice to the visiting Swindon Wildcats. Pre-season ended with a two-legged battle for the Bradfield Brewery Cup. Sheffield Steeldogs won both matches for an aggregate 10-7 victory which meant the Pirates were still awaiting their first-ever victory.

Regular season

References

External links
Twitter

English Premier Ice Hockey League
2015 in English sport
2016 in English sport